Oleg Platov (born 8 April 1983 in Dnipropetrovsk, Ukrainian SSR, Soviet Union) is a Ukrainian former professional boxer who fought in the heavyweight division.

Professional career

Debut fight
After leaving the amateurs ranks Platov was based in Belgium when he became a professional. His first pro bout was in May 2001, winning in Bruges, Belgium, when Platov beat fellow debutant French fighter Jacques Bret with a first round knockout.

Belgian base
Platov fought his first 20 fights in Belgium, suffering only one defeat which was a points defeat to Ludovic Mace. He faced Mace again six months later and avenged the loss, KO'ing Mace in the third round.

First belt
Whilst still based in Belgium, Platov fought for his first title belt against Belarusian Igor Shukala in Brussels, Belgium for the vacant WBC World Youth heavyweight title. Platov knocked the previously unbeaten Shukala out in the first round to take the title.

On November 4, 2006, he fought the former #1 contender Henry Akinwande and won a split decision. This was his greatest achievement, as Akinwande's record at the time was 49–2 and he had fought for the WBC title against Lennox Lewis previously. In December 2007 he fought Danny Williams, another former title contender. The bout ended with a no-decision after Platov was cut over the left eye following an accidental headbutt and the referee stopped the contest.

Platov was then inactive for just over a year, before returning against Jason Gavern, in Zurich, Switzerland. Platov won a clear 8-round decision, flooring Gavern in the sixth round.

Over the next four years, Platov only fought 3 more times, winning them all. His final bout was in November 2012, when he fought in America for the first time, knocking out Harold Sconiers in 2 rounds - his record after this fight was W-30; L-1. D-0; 1 No Contest.

References

External links
 

1983 births
Living people
Heavyweight boxers
Ukrainian male boxers
Sportspeople from Dnipro